Palathalikalu is an Indian sweet dish made during Ganesh Chaturthi in the Delta region of Andhra Pradesh, India.

Preparation

Ingredients
 4 cups milk (whole or 2%)
 1 cup rice flour/biyappu pindi
 1-½ cup sugar
 ½ cup grated coconut/kobbari, fresh or frozen
 4 tbsp sesame seeds/nuvvulu/til, toasted and crushed
 1 tsp cardamom powder/elaichi powder few strands of saffron/kumkuma puvvu
 2 tbsp crushed nuts like cashew, almonds and pistachios
 1 tbsp clarified butter/ghee/neyi
 2 cups water

Method
Boil water in a big, deep vessel/saucepan. Add ghee to it and stir in sifted rice flour.

Stir in with a wooden spoon and see that there are no lumps formed. Once all the rice flour is mixed well with water switch off the gas. Cover and let it cook.

Knead the dough while it is still hot, wet your hands with water and divide the dough into small 2 inch balls and later shape into long strings.

Keep aside and let it dry for 10–15 minutes.

Meanwhile, boil four cups of milk, once it comes to a full boil add sugar, cardamom powder, saffron and let all the flavor blend well on medium heat for about 10 minutes.

Add the prepared rice strings and let it boil for another 7–10 minutes.

Add grated coconut, crushed nuts and crushed sesame seeds for garnishing

This tastes good hot or cold.

Indian desserts
Andhra cuisine